Iwontunwonsi is a live album by pianist Cecil Taylor recorded at Sweet Basil, New York City, on February 8, 1986 and released on the Sound Hills label (Japan). The album features a solo performance by Taylor divided into three sections. Additional tracks from this concert were released on Amewa.

Reception

A review at AllMusic states: "Taylor's concerts are a remarkable union of man and instrument... Paramount at all times is a sense of invention and exploration, Cecil surprising himself. The focus is unrelenting... The piano-playing here is only slightly less astonishing than that exhibited in his Herculean 1974 performance, Silent Tongues. But the structure and unity (who else can create such coherent, committed, large-scale structures?) are at least as remarkable. The audience brings Taylor back for an encore. He sits down and plays for a minute and a half: an after-dinner joke."

Track listing
All compositions by Cecil Taylor.
 "Iwontunwonsi, Part 1" - 3:28
 "Iwontunwonsi, Part 2" - 43:50
 "Iwontunwonsi, Part 3" - 1:37
Recorded at Sweet Basil, New York City, on February 8, 1986

Personnel
Cecil Taylor: piano

References

1995 live albums
Sound Hills Records albums
Cecil Taylor live albums
Solo piano jazz albums